Ulmen is a Mapudungun word meaning "rich man".  In Mapuche society, the wealthy men were usually the loncos and would often be the influential leaders of their rehue and aillarehue. If skilled in war, like the military leader Caupolicán, they were sometimes elected toqui.

Sources

Society of Chile
Mapuche society